Waldo Mootzka (1903–1940) was a Hopi watercolor artist.

Early life 
Waldo Mootzka was born in 1903 into the Hopi tribe near Oraibi, Arizona, also known as Third Mesa on the Hopi Reservation. His father was Tom Mootzka and his mother was a member of the Badger Clan. Based on census data, Mootzka grew up with three sisters–Daisy, Amelia, and Norma.  Growing up in Hopi culture inspired most of the subject matter of Mootzka's paintings. However, there is not much said about his young childhood. Once he started to come of age he attended Oraibi day school. Oraibi school was a boarding school that attempted to erase the Hopi culture and replace it with Anglo culture. However, some of the teachers at this boarding school in secret let the students paint. Some individuals used this in order to express their culture. His informal training began at the boarding school, and he also studied at Shungopovi, known as Second Mesa on Hopiland. There is no record of Mootzka being married. Toward the end of his life he started to study silversmithing in Santa Fe. Mootzka died in 1940 following a car accident which exacerbated his tuberculosis.

Career 

Mootzka's career started during his time at boarding school observing fellow Hopi painter Fred Kabotie. However, Mootzka never formally trained under anyone, and his watercolor skills were all self-taught. Most of the paintings that Mootzka created were about Hopi life and the ceremonies within it. However, he did experiment more than some of his fellow painters. This might indicate a European influence he gained at boarding school.

Many of his paintings depicted Katsinam figures, depictions of Hopi supernatural beings, or of kachina dancers, as represented in Hopi Kachina figures (Kachina dolls). These Hopi deities differ than the Pueblo peoples living the Rio Grande valley, in that the Hopis were much less influenced by Catholicism due to their remote location on three mesa tops in Arizona.

The Studio School movement

Mootzka's art was part of a trend in the 1930s in the Southwest, known as The Studio School movement. The painting style, introduced by Dorothy Dunn, an Anglo teacher at Santo Domingo Pueblo, acknowledged elements of Cubism, Symbolism and other current European sensibilities, yet promoted the "flat style" of painting found in traditional Pueblo pottery designs and murals. In the later part of his career Mootzka focused on silversmithing more than watercolor. Mootzka would at times incorporate Art Deco, or more specifically, Pueblo Deco motifs and design sensibilities into his work.

Collections 
Brooklyn Museum
Museum of the American Indian in New York
Gilcrease Museum Institute and the Philbrook Art Center in Tulsa, Oklahoma 
Museum of Fine Arts, Houston
Museum of Northern Arizona, Flagstaff, Arizona 
Southwest Museum, Los Angeles, California
McNay Art Museum

References

1903 births
1940 deaths
Native American artists
Hopi people
Watercolorists
Artists from Arizona
Road incident deaths in Arizona
20th-century Native Americans